Stefan Jović (born November 3, 1990) is a Serbian professional basketball player for Basket Zaragoza of the Liga ACB. He represents the senior Serbian national basketball team internationally.

Club career
Jović played in the youth system of Ergonom from his hometown Niš. From 2010 to 2012 he played with Sloga. In July 2012, he signed a three-year contract with Radnički.

Crvena zvezda (2014–2017) 
On September 21, 2014, he signed a three-year deal with Crvena zvezda. In the 2014–15 season, his first with the club, Crvena zvezda won the ABA League championship, the Serbian League championship and the Serbian Cup. He also appeared in 19 games in the EuroLeague, averaging 2.9 points, 2.8 assists and 2.1 rebounds.

On November 12, 2015, in a road game against Bayern Munich, he set the Euroleague record for the most assists in a single game – 19. In May 2016, he was named MVP of the 2015–16 ABA League Finals.

On September 8, 2016, he re-signed with the team until the end of the 2017–18 season. On October 3, 2016, in a home game against Cedevita, he recorded 16 assists in 24 minutes.

Bayern Munich (2017–2019)
On July 14, 2017, Jović signed a two-year deal with German team Bayern Munich. In his first season with the team, Jović with Bayern lifted the 2017–18 Basketball Bundesliga championship trophy by defeating Alba Berlin with 3–2 in the final series. Over 40 games league games, he averaged 7.4 points and 5.3 assists, while shooting 54.7% from the field goal. In EuroCup, he appeared in 15 games and averaged 5.3 points and 5.6 assists per game.

In 2018–19 season, Jović appeared in 35 games of the Bundesliga and averaged 6.3 points and 4.8 assists, while shooting 44.4% from the field goal. Bayern eventually defended the championship trophy by defeating Alba Berlin with 3–0 in the final series of 2018–19 Basketball Bundesliga. In the EuroLeague, he averaged 8.3 points and 4.6 assists over 23 games played.

Khimki (2019–2021)
On July 17, 2019, Jović signed a contract with the Russian team Khimki. On October 3, 2019, Jović left the court with back pain in a game against Maccabi Tel Aviv. During the 2019-2020 season with Khimki, Jović averaged 7.6 points, 4.2 assists and 1.3 steals per contest in a total of 23 EuroLeague games. In the following season, he appeared in only 8 EuroLeague contests due to personal injuries and the club's dire financial situation, with a stat line of 4.4 points, 3.8 assists and 2 rebounds per game.

Panathinaikos (2022)
On January 7, 2022, Jović signed a contract with Panathinaikos of the Greek Basket League and the EuroLeague for the remainder of the 2021–22 season, with the option for an additional season. In 5 Greek Basket League games, he averaged 3.4 points, 1.4 rebounds and 2 assists, playing around 13 minutes per contest. Additionally, in 4 EuroLeague games, he averaged 3.5 points, 2.5 rebounds and 2.2 assists, playing around 21 minutes per contest. His season as a whole was heavily plagued with various injuries and he never fully entered the team's rotation.

Basket Zaragoza (2022–present)
On December 12, 2022, he signed with Basket Zaragoza of the Liga ACB.

National team career

In the youth category, Jović was a member of the squad that won the silver medal at the 2013 Mediterranean Games and bronze medal at the 2013 University Games. He was also a member of the Serbian national basketball team that won silver medals at the 2014 FIBA Basketball World Cup and the 2016 Summer Olympics.

Jović also represented Serbia at the EuroBasket 2017 where they won the silver medal, after losing in the final game to Slovenia. Over 9 tournament games, he averaged 6.4 points, 2.4 rebounds and 5.4 assists per game.

At the 2019 FIBA Basketball World Cup, the national team of Serbia was dubbed as favorite to win the trophy, but was eventually upset in the quarterfinals by Argentina. With wins over the United States and Czech Republic, it finished in fifth place. With yet another absence of team's captain Teodosić due to injury, Jović emerged as the starting point guard of the team and averaged 7 points, 3.9 rebounds and 5.4 assists per game.

Career achievements and awards
 Club
 Serbian League champion: 3  (with Crvena zvezda: 2014–15, 2015–16, 2016–17)
 German League champion: 2 (with Bayern Munich: 2017–18,  2018–19)
 Serbian Radivoj Korać Cup winner: 2  (with Crvena zvezda: 2014–15, 2016–17)
 Adriatic League champion: 3  (with Crvena zvezda: 2015, 2015–16, 2016–17)

Individual
 ABA League Finals MVP: (2016)
 All-ABA League Team: (2017)
 2× Niš Sportsperson of the Year: 2014, 2016.

Personal life
Jović plays the guitar.

Career statistics

EuroLeague

|-
| style="text-align:left;"| 2014–15
| style="text-align:left;" rowspan=3| Crvena zvezda
| 19 || 1 || 13.6 || .361 || .261 || .625 || 2.1 || 2.8 || 1.0 || .1 || 2.9 || 4.8
|-
| style="text-align:left;"| 2015–16
| 27 || 22 || 23.2 || .408 || .356 || .788 || 3.0 || 5.7 || 1.2 || .1 || 7.0 || 9.7
|-
| style="text-align:left;"| 2016–17
| 23 || 23 || 23.9 || .426 || .291 || .613 || 2.1 || 5.6 || 1.3 || .0 || 7.5 || 9.3
|-
| style="text-align:left;"| 2018–19
| style="text-align:left;"| Bayern
| 23 || 17 || 21.5 || .510 || .400 || .741 || 2.4 || 4.6 || 1.3 || .0 || 8.3 || 10.2
|-
| style="text-align:left;"| 2019–20
| style="text-align:left;"| Khimki
| 23 || 17 || 23.4 || .576 || .532 || .618 || 1.9 || 4.2 || 1.3 || 0 || 7.6 || 10
|- class="sortbottom"
| style="text-align:center;" colspan=2| Career
| 115 || 80 || 21.1 || .460 || .376 || .684 || 2.3 || 4.7 || 1.2 || .1 || 6.8 || 9.0

See also
 List of Olympic medalists in basketball
 List of KK Crvena zvezda players with 100 games played

References

External links

 Stefan Jović at aba-liga.com
 Stefan Jović at eurobasket.com
 Stefan Jović at euroleague.net
 Stefan Jović at vtb-league.com

1990 births
Living people
2014 FIBA Basketball World Cup players
2019 FIBA Basketball World Cup players
ABA League players

Basketball League of Serbia players
Basketball players at the 2016 Summer Olympics
Basketball players from Niš
BC Khimki players
Competitors at the 2013 Mediterranean Games
FC Bayern Munich basketball players
KK Crvena zvezda players
KK Radnički Kragujevac (2009–2014) players
KK Sloga players
Medalists at the 2013 Summer Universiade
Medalists at the 2016 Summer Olympics
Mediterranean Games medalists in basketball
Mediterranean Games silver medalists for Serbia
Olympic basketball players of Serbia
Olympic medalists in basketball
Olympic silver medalists for Serbia
Panathinaikos B.C. players
People from Niš
Point guards
Serbia men's national basketball team players
Serbian expatriate basketball people in Greece
Serbian expatriate basketball people in Germany
Serbian expatriate basketball people in Russia
Serbian men's basketball players
Universiade bronze medalists for Serbia
Universiade medalists in basketball